František "Franta" Nekolný (November 26, 1907 – October 4, 1990) was a Czech boxer who competed for Czechoslovakia in the 1928 Summer Olympics.

In 1928 he was eliminated in the second round of the welterweight class after losing his fight to Robert Galataud.

External links

Rozhlas.cz

1907 births
1990 deaths
Czechoslovak male boxers
Welterweight boxers
Olympic boxers of Czechoslovakia
Boxers at the 1928 Summer Olympics
Czech male boxers